Lucia Palermo (born 30 September 1985) is an Argentine rower. At the 2004 Olympics, she competed in the women's lightweight sculls with Milka Kraljev, finishing in 17th place.  She competed in the single sculls race at the 2012 Summer Olympics and placed 3rd in Final D and 21st overall.

At the 2012 South American Rowing Championships, she and Maria Gabriela Best won the women's double sculls.

References

1985 births
Living people
Argentine female rowers
Pan American Games bronze medalists for Argentina
Olympic rowers of Argentina
Rowers at the 2004 Summer Olympics
Rowers at the 2012 Summer Olympics
Rowers at the 2016 Summer Olympics
Rowers at the 2015 Pan American Games
Pan American Games medalists in rowing
South American Games gold medalists for Argentina
South American Games silver medalists for Argentina
South American Games medalists in rowing
Competitors at the 2010 South American Games
Medalists at the 2015 Pan American Games
21st-century Argentine women